Pronsk is the name of several inhabited localities in Ryazan Oblast, Russia.

Urban localities
Pronsk, Pronsky District, Ryazan Oblast, a work settlement in Pronsky District

Rural localities
Pronsk, Ukholovsky District, Ryazan Oblast, a selo in Konoplinsky Rural Okrug of Ukholovsky District